Hemerobiidae is a family of Neuropteran insects commonly known as brown lacewings, comprising about 500 species in 28 genera. Most are yellow to dark brown, but some species are green. They are small; most have forewings 4–10 mm long (some up to 18 mm). These insects differ from the somewhat similar Chrysopidae (green lacewings) not only by the usual coloring but also by the wing venation: hemerobiids differ from chrysopids in having numerous long veins (two or more radial sectors) and forked costal cross veins. Some genera (Hemerobius, Micromus, Notiobiella, Sympherobius, Wesmaelius) are widespread, but most are restricted to a single biogeographical realm. Some species have reduced wings to the degree that they are flightless. Imagines (adults) of subfamily Drepanepteryginae mimic dead leaves. Hemerobiid larvae are usually less hairy than chrysopid larvae.

Hemerobiids, like chrysopids, are predatory, especially on aphids, both as larvae and adults. The species Micromus tasmaniae is bred for biological pest control.

Systematics
The relationships between the Hemerobiidae and the other Neuropteran families are still unresolved. Despite their superficial similarity to chrysopids, the brown and green lacewings may not be as closely related as was at one time believed. Rather, the Hemerobiidae appear to be closely related to the Mantispidae.

The superfamily Hemerobioidea is currently restricted to the Hemerobiidae. Formerly, the  pleasing lacewings (Dilaridae), silky lacewings (Psychopsidae), giant lacewings (Polystoechotidae) and as noted above the green lacewings (Chrysopidae) were placed therein too. Of these, only the Dilaridae and Chrysopidae seem to be reasonably close relatives of the brown lacewings. The Psychopsidae in fact seem to belong to an altogether different suborder of Neuroptera, the Myrmeleontiformia.

Phylogeny

Cladogram of Hemerobiidae relations, based on morphological and molecular data. Psychobiellinae was rearranged into Notiobiellinae and Zachobiellinae, and Adelphohemerobiinae was placed as incertae sedis.

Genera
The subfamilies of Hemerobiidae are:

 Subfamily Adelphohemerobiinae
 Genus Adelphohemerobius Oswald, 1993
 Subfamily Drepanacrinae
 Genus Austromegalomus
 Genus Conchopterella
 Genus Drepanacra
 Subfamily Carobiinae
 Genus Carobius
 Subfamily Drepanepteryginae
 Genus Drepanepteryx Leach, 1815
 Genus Gayomyia
 Genus Neuronema 
 Subfamily Hemerobiinae
 Genus Biramus
 Genus Hemerobiella
 Genus Hemerobius Linnaeus, 1758
 Genus Nesobiella
 Genus Wesmaelius Krüger, 1922
 Subfamily Megalominae
 Genus Megalomus  Rambur, 1842 
 Subfamily Microminae
 Genus Megalomina Banks, 1909
 Genus Micromus Rambur, 1842
 Genus Nusalala Navás, 1913
 Subfamily Notiobiellinae
 Genus Anapsectra
 Genus Notiobiella
 Genus Psectra Hagen, 1866
 Genus Zachobiella
Subfamily Psychobiellinae
 Genus Psychobiella
 Subfamily Sympherobiinae
 Genus Neosympherobius
 Genus Nesobiella
 Genus Sympherobius Banks, 1904

Apart from the genera assigned to subfamilies, the genus Notherobius is of uncertain or fairly basal position.

Fossils

Numerous fossil Hemerobiidae have been described, some from the still-living genera, others from genera that are entirely extinct today. While most have been found in Eocene to Miocene rocks or amber, Promegalomus is known from the Jurassic. It was formerly considered to constitute a distinct family Promegalomidae, but is currently recognized as a very basal member of the Hemerobiidae. The Cretaceous Mesohemerobius was formerly considered a brown lacewing, but is today rather placed as incertae sedis in the Neuroptera; it might be a member of the Hemerobioidea but not even that is certain. Notable fossil Hemerobiidae genera are:

 Bothromicromus Scudder, 1878 (Eocene/Oligocene; Quesnel, British Columbia)
 Brasilopsychopsis Crato Formation Brazil, Early Cretaceous (Aptian)
 Cratopsychopsis Crato Formation Brazil, Aptian
 Cretomerobius Ponomarenko, 1992 Dzun-Bain Formation, Mongolia, Aptian
Hemeroberotha Makarkin & Gröhn, 2020 Burmese amber, Myanmar, Late Cretaceous (Cenomanian)
Mucropalpus Pictet, 1856 (Eocene; Baltic amber)
Plesiorobius Klimaszewski and Kevan 1986 Late Cretaceous (Taimyr amber, Russia, Santonian Canadian amber, Campanian Ola Formation, Russia, Campanian)
 Prochlanius Kruger, 1923 (Eocene; Baltic amber)
 Promegalomus Panfilov, 1980 Karabastau Formation, Kazakhstan, Middle/Late Jurassic (Callovian/Oxfordian)
 Prophlebonema Kruger, 1923 (Eocene; Baltic amber)
 Prospadobius Kruger, 1923 (Eocene; Baltic amber)
Purbemerobius Jepson et al. 2012 Durlston Formation, United Kingdom, Early Cretaceous (Berriasian)

The extinct genus Hemerobites was originally described in 1813 from a specimen preserved in Baltic amber as a hemerobiid. However further study has resulted in its synonymy with the genus Eutermes and placement in the termite subfamily Termitina.  The species Wesmaelius mathewesi, was described in 2003 from a solitary Eocene fossil found near Quesnel, British Columbia, and placed into the extant genus Wesmaelius. At that time it was the oldest Hemerobiinae species described. Another species from the same genus, Wesmaelius makarkini was found in Garang Formation of Zeku County, Qinghai Province, China, in 2018. The finding is from Lower Miocene.

Some additional brown lacewing larvae have been found as fossils, but it has been impossible to determine their generic or subfamilial association.

References

  (1986): Collins Guide to the Insects of Britain and Western Europe.

External links

 BioLib Taxonomic tree of Hemerobiidae (incomplete)
Brown lacewings of Florida on the UF / IFAS Featured Creatures Web site

Hemerobiiformia
Neuroptera
Neuroptera families
Articles containing video clips
Extant Jurassic first appearances